Umesh Sharma Kau is an Indian politician and member of the Bharatiya Janata Party. Sharma is a member of the Uttarakhand Legislative Assembly from the Raipur constituency in Dehradun district.

In the 2012 Uttarakhand Assembly elections, Umesh Sharma Kau, then with the Indian National Congress, defeated Trivendra Singh Rawat by a narrow margin of 0.62% votes.

In 2016, Umesh Sharma Kau along with other Congress MLAs rebelled and switched over to BJP.

References 

Indian National Congress politicians
Bharatiya Janata Party politicians from Uttarakhand
Uttarakhand MLAs 2022–2027
Living people
Uttarakhand MLAs 2017–2022
Year of birth missing (living people)